Zamora Railway Station  is the central railway station of Zamora, Spain. Commonly referred locally as the RENFE station, the station is part of Adif and high-speed rail systems: it is located on one of the North-Northwestern high speed lines.

References 

Railway stations in Spain opened in 1864
Railway stations in Castile and León
Buildings and structures in Zamora, Spain